Arthur Barnes may refer to:

 Arthur Barnes (monsignor) (1861–1936), English Roman Catholic writer and university chaplain
 Arthur Barnes (politician) (1866–1956), educator and politician in Newfoundland
 Arthur K. Barnes (1909–1969), American science fiction writer
 Arthur P. Barnes, professor of music at Stanford University